Elvira Rahić (born 1 September 1973) is a Bosnian pop-folk singer. Rahić began her professional music career in 1991 and has since released ten studio albums. She lives in Sarajevo and Vienna.

Career
Rahić will release her eleventh studio album by May 2015.

Personal life
Rahić is married to Šaban Forić and together they have a son named Dino. She and her husband are practicing Muslims. The couple lived in Sarajevo before moving to Berlin in 2007 when Forić became employed at the Embassy of Bosnia and Herzegovina in Berlin. Forić was relocated to the Bosnian embassy in Vienna in November 2011.

Discography
Zvao si me Elice (1991)
Želim te (1992)
Želim to sreću (1994)
Sada znam (1995)
Šta ako se zaljubim (1997)
Izbriši sve uspomene (1999)
Ljubav gospodine (2001)
Hotel "Čekanje" (2005)
Miraz (2008)
Cura sa čaršije (2011)
The Very Best Of Elvira Rahić (2013)

References

External links
Elvira Rahić discography at Discogs

1975 births
Living people
Musicians from Skopje
Bosniaks of Bosnia and Herzegovina
Bosnia and Herzegovina Muslims
21st-century Bosnia and Herzegovina women singers
Bosnia and Herzegovina folk-pop singers
Hayat Production artists
Macedonian people of Bosnia and Herzegovina descent